The Liberian Civil War may refer to one of the following conflicts:
First Liberian Civil War, 1989–1997
Second Liberian Civil War, 1999–2003